The Ripley Fire Lookout Tower, on Joe Crihfield Rd. in Ripley, Tennessee, was listed on the National Register of Historic Places in 2020.

It was built around 1970 for the Tennessee Division of Forestry.

It is also known as Edith tower.

References

Fire lookout towers on the National Register of Historic Places in Tennessee
National Register of Historic Places in Lauderdale County, Tennessee
Buildings and structures completed in 1970